Sathaiyar (Tamil:சாத்தையாறு) originates from sirumalai hills and flows southward and empties into Vaigai River. Near Vadipatti, Sathaiyar Dam has been constructed across this river for irrigation purpose.

References

Rivers of Tamil Nadu
Rivers of India